Saidabad (also Romanized as Sa‘īdābād; also known as Seyyedābād) is a village in Razmavaran Rural District, in the Central District of Rafsanjan County, Kerman Province, Iran. At the 2006 census, its population was 407, in 99 families.

References 

Populated places in Rafsanjan County